Vittorio Belmondo is a former Italian racing driver. He entered 23 races in Maseratis and Alfa Romeos between 1934 and 1938, his best results being one victory, one second place and three third places.

Complete results

Sources
 Racing Sports Cars
 1937 AIACR European Driver Championship 
 1938 AIACR European Driver Championship 
 kolumbus.fi, Vittorio Belmondo 
 motorgraphs.com
 
 kolumbus.fi, Circuits in Italy 

Place of birth missing
Year of birth missing
Year of death missing
Italian racing drivers
Mille Miglia drivers
European Championship drivers